Lawnweed may refer to:

 Weeds of lawns
 Soliva sessilis, a weed of lawns